Beddomeia inflata is a species of very small freshwater snail that has a gill and an operculum, an aquatic operculate gastropod mollusk in the family Hydrobiidae. This species is endemic to Australia.

See also
List of non-marine molluscs of Australia

References

External links

Gastropods of Australia
Hydrobiidae
Beddomeia
Vulnerable fauna of Australia
Endemic fauna of Australia
Gastropods described in 1993
Taxonomy articles created by Polbot